Army of Germany or Armée d'Allemagne may refer to:

Army of Germany (1797), a French field army
Army of Germany (1809), a French field army

See also
German Army (disambiguation)